Ault Hucknall (Old English: Hucca's nook of land) is a village and civil parish in the Bolsover district of Derbyshire, England. The population of the civil parish at the 2011 census was 1,053.

Local residents describe the settlement as the 'smallest village in England', as it consists of only a church and three houses. The philosopher Thomas Hobbes was interred within Ault Hucknall's St John the Baptist Church following his death in 1679.

Hardwick Hall is within the parish boundary, which also contains the settlements of Astwith, Bramley Vale, Doe Lea, Hardstoft, Rowthorne and Stainsby.

See also
 Listed buildings in Ault Hucknall
 List of places in Derbyshire
 Murder of Barbara Mayo, infamous unsolved murder of a woman which occurred in the village in 1970

Notes

References

External links

Ault Hucknall CP (Parish) Neighbourhood statistics website, Office for National Statistics.
Church Guide
Photos

Bolsover District
Villages in Derbyshire